The Great American Bagel Bakery is a privately owned restaurant franchise started in 1987.  The company is based in Westmont, Illinois.  Currently, there are 52 locations in 12 states.

History
The Great American Bagel was established in 1987 by president Wayne Flately. The Great American Bagel started franchising in 1994 with the help of Pat Ross, retired founder and president of Rax Restaurants.

See also
The Great Canadian Bagel

References

External links
 Official Great American Bagel Bakery website
 Great American Bagel: Franchising Information

Privately held companies based in Illinois
Companies based in DuPage County, Illinois
Restaurants established in 1987
Bagel companies